Alonza Bailey (February 16, 1904 – April 26, 1984) was an American baseball pitcher in the Negro leagues. He played with the Newark Dodgers in 1934 and the 1935 and the Brooklyn Royal Giants in 1936.

References

External links
 and Baseball-Reference Black Baseball Stats and Seamheads

Newark Dodgers players
Brooklyn Royal Giants players
1904 births
1984 deaths
Baseball players from Georgia (U.S. state)
Baseball pitchers
20th-century African-American sportspeople